Bárbara Latorre Viñals (born 14 March 1993) is a Spanish professional footballer who is currently playing as a forward in Primera División for Atlético Madrid Femenino. She previously played for Prainsa Zaragoza, Real Sociedad Femenino, Espanyol and Barcelona, with which she has also played the UEFA Women's Champions League.

Club career
Latorre began her senior career as a futsal player in Spanish Women Futsal Championship, until in 2011 her goalscoring abilities attracted the attention of the Primera División club Prainsa Zaragoza that required a forward player for their reserve team. She spent two years at the club quickly becoming one of their first team players and in her second season at the club she and her teammates became the runner-up at Copa de la Reina losing the final to Barcelona, as well as taking the 7th spot on the year end table in Primera División.

Latorre refused to renew her contract with Zaragoza at the end of 2012–13 season and decided to join the then ranked 5th club Espanyol. At the end of her first season at Espanyol she managed to find a place among the top 11 goalscorers of the 2013–14 season with 13 goals, becoming the club's top scorer.

In 2015 Latorre joined the four consecutive league champion Barcelona after the departure of some of their key players and quickly established herself as one of their most important players in forward position scoring 9 goals throughout the 2015–16 Championship mid-season.

International career
Her match debut happened on 15 September 2016, coming on as a substitute during Spain's UEFA Women's Euro 2017 qualifying 13–0 win against Montenegro in Las Rozas de Madrid.

International goals

Honours
Barcelona
 Copa de la Reina: 2017

Spain
 Algarve Cup: Winner 2017
 Cyprus Cup: 2018

References

External links
 
  at FC Barcelona
 
 
 

1993 births
Living people
Spanish women's footballers
FC Barcelona Femení players
Primera División (women) players
Spain women's international footballers
Women's association football forwards
Footballers from Zaragoza
Zaragoza CFF players
Atlético Madrid Femenino players
RCD Espanyol Femenino players
Real Sociedad (women) players
UEFA Women's Euro 2017 players
21st-century Spanish women